Far Gone is the third studio album by Seattle grunge band Love Battery, released in 1993 through Sub Pop.

Track listing

Personnel
 Ron Nine - vocals
 Kevin Whitworth - guitar
 Bruce Fairweather - bass
 Jason Finn - drums
Production
 Michael Beinhorn - producer, mixing
 Dan Gellert - engineer, mixing
 Greg Di Gesu - second engineer
 Jeff Mauriello - assistant engineer
Artwork
 Love Battery - primary artist
 Art Chantry - design
 Karen Moskowitz - photography
 Charles Peterson - tray photography

References

1993 albums
Sub Pop albums
Love Battery albums
Albums produced by Michael Beinhorn